Joseph Willis was an early 19th-century minister who has been described by some historians as the "father of the Baptist religion in Louisiana". His paternal family first migrated to Colonial Virginia Isle of Wight before moving to the Carolinas. He is a descendant of the Willis family that founded and first settled Plymouth Rock. He is also by marriage related to William Bradford of Plymouth, of whom his wife Rachel Bradford was a direct descendant. 

Willis, a freedman from North Carolina, was born in 1758. He was the son of an Englishman, Agerton Willis, and a Cherokee slave making him born into slavery, his father Agerton granted Joseph freedom in his will upon his death however some family members denied Joseph his freedom, He was a "Marion Men" fighting during the Revolutionary War under  General Francis Marion "The Swamp Fox" who is considered the "father of American guerrilla warfare". After the war Joseph first cousins General John Willis and Daniel Willis petitioned for Josephs freedom and was finally emancipated a second time. After the war and around the time of the Louisiana purchase he left the Carolinas to start a new life. He left with "a horse, a bridle, and a saddle. Legend has it he even crossed the mighty Mississippi on nothing but his horse. Thus The Willis family has deep roots in the founding of America and of early Baptist Church and was a part of the spiritual "Great Awakening" in the 1800s. 

His first church mission failed, but he redoubled his efforts and was rewarded with a successful congregation in Opelousas, the seat of St. Landry Parish.

He is also considered to be the "Father of the Red Bones," a tribe of mixed-blood Native Americans most of the Cherokee and Lumbee. It has been said that when Reverend Joseph Willis died, three years later a large number of mulatto, or mixed, Native Americans traveled to pay their last respects to a great man considered to this day to be "the first to preach a Baptist sermon west of the Mississippi." He is buried at Occupy No. 1 in Louisiana.

References

"Joseph Willis", A Dictionary of Louisiana Biography, Vol. 2 (1988), p. 853
O'Neill, Charles Edwards, et al. Louisiana: a History
Gayarré, Charles. History of Louisiana

19th-century Baptist ministers from the United States
People from North Carolina
People from Opelousas, Louisiana
1758 births
Year of death missing
19th-century deaths
African-American Baptist ministers
Year of birth unknown
Baptists from Louisiana